The Villa Valmarana (also known as Valmarana Scagnolari Zen) is a Renaissance villa situated in Lisiera, a locality of Bolzano Vicentino, province of Vicenza, northern Italy. Designed by Andrea Palladio, it was originally built in the 1560s for the Valmarana family.

The villa was nearly totally destroyed during World War II, but has been rebuilt. Even before the war damage, the building did not closely resemble the plan which Palladio published in his I quattro libri dell'architettura (The Four Books of Architecture) of 1570, possibly because Gianfrancesco Valmarana, the architect's client, died while his house was being built.

See also
Palazzo Valmarana
Loggia Valmarana
Palladian Villas of the Veneto
Palladian architecture

References

Andrea Palladio buildings
Valmarana Scagnolari Zen
Renaissance architecture in Veneto
Palladian villas of Veneto